Abhiyum Naanum may refer to:

 Abhiyum Naanum (film), a 2008 Indian Tamil-language film 
 Abhiyum Naanum (TV series), a 2020 Indian Tamil-language soap opera

See also
 Abhiyum Njanum, a 2013 Indian Malayalam film